Semaeopus indignaria is a moth of the family Geometridae first described by Achille Guenée in 1857. It is found in South America and on the Greater Antilles.

Subspecies
Semaeopus indignaria indignaria (South America)
Semaeopus indignaria filiferata Walker, 1863 (Greater Antilles)

References

Moths described in 1858
Cosymbiini